Three male athletes from Peru competed at the 1996 Summer Paralympics in Atlanta, United States. Jaime Eulert won Peru's first ever gold medal in swimming.

Medallists

See also
Peru at the Paralympics
Peru at the 1996 Summer Olympics

References 

Nations at the 1996 Summer Paralympics
1996
Summer Paralympics